Stairs are a set of steps.

Stairs may also refer to:

 Stairs (surname), a list of people with the surname
 The Stairs, retro rock band
 "The Stairs" (song), by INXS
 The Stairs (1950 film), a short documentary
 The Stairs (2016 film), a Canadian documentary film
 The Stairs (2021 film)
 IBM STAIRS, IBM "Storage and Information Retrieval System" software
 Stairs (video game)
 "Stairs", a song by the 3rd and the Mortal from the album Painting on Glass

See also
 House of Stairs (disambiguation)
 Stair (disambiguation)